The 2021 FIBA Europe Cup Final was the concluding game of the 2020–21 FIBA Europe Cup season. The final was played as the culmination of the Final Four which was held at the Menora Mivtachim Arena in Tel Aviv.

Venue
The game was originally scheduled to be in the Drive in Arena, but this was changed to the Menora Mivtachim Arena to allow for more fans.

Road to the final

Note: In the table, the score of the finalist is given first (H = home; A = away).

Game

References

See also
2021 EuroLeague Final Four
2021 Basketball Champions League Final Four

2021
2020–21 FIBA Europe Cup
FIBA Europe Cup Finals
2020–21 in Polish basketball
2020–21 in Israeli basketball
International basketball competitions hosted by Israel